Mount Ida is a former parliamentary electorate in the Otago region of New Zealand, from 1871 to 1893, and then from 1902 to 1908.

Population centres
The Representation Act 1900 had increased the membership of the House of Representatives from general electorates 70 to 76, and this was implemented through the 1902 electoral redistribution. In 1902, changes to the country quota affected the three-member electorates in the four main centres. The tolerance between electorates was increased to ±1,250 so that the Representation Commissions (since 1896, there had been separate commissions for the North and South Islands) could take greater account of communities of interest. These changes proved very disruptive to existing boundaries, and six electorates were established for the first time, and two electorates that previously existed were re-established, including Mount Ida.

Mount Ida was a rural electorate in Central Otago. It is based on Naseby and uses its prior name.

History
David Mervyn was the first representative. He served until the end of the parliamentary term in 1875. Mervyn was succeeded by Cecil de Lautour, who won the 1876 election and served until 1884.

The electorate was abolished in 1893 and re-established in 1902.  Between 1893 and 1902 most of the seat was in the Waihemo electorate, with some in the Tuapeka  or Wakatipu electorates.

Members of Parliament
The electorate was represented by five Members of Parliament:

Key

Election results

1890 election

Notes

References

Historical electorates of New Zealand
1870 establishments in New Zealand
1893 disestablishments in New Zealand
1908 disestablishments in New Zealand
1902 establishments in New Zealand